The Dayton Owls was a minor league ice hockey team in the International Hockey League (IHL) during the 1977–78 season. The team was based in Dayton, Ohio, and played home games at the Hara Arena. The Columbus Owls had relocated to Dayton for the 1977–78 season, filling the void left by the Dayton Gems. Midway during their first season, on December 15, 1977 the Dayton Owls relocated to Grand Rapids, Michigan and became the Grand Rapids Owls.

References

International Hockey League (1945–2001) teams
Ice hockey teams in Dayton, Ohio
Defunct ice hockey teams in Ohio
1977 establishments in Ohio
1977 disestablishments in Ohio
Ice hockey clubs established in 1977
Ice hockey clubs disestablished in 1977